Srilatha Batliwala, a social activist, advocate of women's rights, scholar, and author of many books on empowerment of women is from Bengaluru (earlier known as Bangalore), Karnataka, India. From the later part of the 1970s she has been engaged in linking "grassroots activism, advocacy, teaching, research, training," obtaining grants, and works of scholarly nature.

Empowerment of women came to defined in the middle of 1980s, which according to Baltiwala is a terminology which signified "welfare, upliftment, community participation, and poverty alleviation."

According to Baltiwala the empowerment laws related to women are easily passed in India but its implementation is tardy, and comparable to a similar situation in Egypt. She is also of the opinion that the "adverse reaction to organising and mobilizing" women's movements is on the rise compared to earlier times.

Biography
Batliwala was born in Bengaluru, India. She graduated from the Tata Institute of Social Sciences, Bombay with a Master of Arts (MA) degree in Social Work. From the late 1970 to late 1990s she worked in India promoting feminist movement, build leadership qualities in women, monitor and assess gender-sensitive issues, and create a pool of women activists. She was instrumental in establishing four institutions and two grassroot level feminist campaigns. From middle of 1990s she has worked outside Bengaluru in many international institutions; as a Program Officer with the Ford Foundation (1997 - 2000), New York City; Civil Society Research Fellow at the Hauser Center for Nonprofit Organizations on "transnational civil society, particularly on transnational grassroots movements"; in Harvard University; and Chair of the Board of the Women’s Environment and Development Organization, New York City.

Batliwala is actively involved in many organizations dealing with women's rights such as a Scholar Associate with the Association for Women’s Rights in Development (AWID),  Co-Chair of the board of "Gender at Work" (a global network of women), and member of the board of "Samudaya Nirman Sahayak" and SPARC in Mumbai which was founded in 1984 to facilitate urban poor to take part in development works of the community. She also did research at the National Institute of Advanced Studies of the Indian Institute of Science in Bengaluru. on the status of women in Karnataka. Her empowerment actions have benefited poor and Dalit women in both rural and urban areas. This action is notable in facilitating election of poor and uneducated women of villages into the local self-government bodies under  the Panchayati Raj; their representation was much above the prescribed limit of 33% reservation for women, in several districts.

Batliwala was a Fellow, Women's Policy Research, and Advocacy, National Institute of Advanced Studies, Bengaluru. She is currently Senior Advisor, Knowledge Building, CREA (Creating Resources for Empowerment in Action). She is the President of the NGO IT for Change.

The goals of women's empowerment according to Batliwala are "to challenge patriarchal ideology, transform the structures that reinforce and perpetuate gender discrimination and social inequality, and enable women to gain access and control over, both material and information resources."

Batliwala is married, works from Bengaluru, and has two children and four grandchildren.

Publications
Batliwala has many publications to her credit on women's empowerment and development issues and her best known book Women’s Empowerment in South Asia – Concepts and Practices, (1993), which has been published in more than 20 languages, is a "conceptual framework and manual" which is widely used as a training manual for empowerment of women. Her other important publications are: Status of Rural Women in Karnataka (1998) on gender equations; Transnational Civil Society: An Introduction with Lloyd David Brown (2006); Grassroots Movements as Global Actors; and Feminist Leadership for Social Transformation: Clearing the Conceptual Cloud (2011).

Bibliography

References

Living people
Indian women activists
Women writers from Karnataka
Writers from Bangalore
Indian feminist writers
English-language writers from India
Activists from Karnataka
20th-century Indian women writers
20th-century Indian writers
Year of birth missing (living people)